The symbol ↯ is a Unicode character. It may refer to:
 a contradiction (the relationship between incompatible propositions) in mathematical logic
 electrolysis (the process of using an electrical current to separate molecules) in chemistry

See also 
 Arrow (disambiguation)
 → (disambiguation)
 ↑ (disambiguation)
 ↓ (disambiguation)
 ← (disambiguation)